

Qualification system
A total of 56 skaters will qualify to compete at the Games. 20 male and 20 female speed skaters will qualify, while 8 male and 8 female figure skaters will also qualify. A nation may enter a maximum of six athletes (two male and two females on speed skating, with a maximum of one athlete per each figure skating event). The host nation (Canada) is automatically qualified with a full team.

Qualification summary

Figure
The top seven in each event, along with the host nation (Canada) qualified to compete at the Games. The qualification tournament took place between January 17 and 20 in Kissimmee, Florida, United States.

Canada had no male competitors register for the national trials, and thus this quota was reallocated.

Speed
The qualification event for speed competitions were held between January 23 and 27, 2014 in Cooper City, Florida.

Costa Rica qualified two women, but only one was entered into the competitions, meaning 19 athletes qualified (instead of the 20 quotas).

References

P
Qualification for the 2015 Pan American Games
Roller sports at the 2015 Pan American Games